Argishti Elbeki Kyaramyan (born 1991) is an Armenian prosecutor and politician who had previously served as the deputy head of the Armenian State Control Service, the deputy head of the Armenian Investigative Committee, the deputy head of the Armenian National Security Service (NSS), and the head of the Armenian NSS. He currently serves as the deputy chairman of the Armenian Investigative Committee.

Early life 
Argishti Elbeki Kyaramyan was born on 22 May 1991, in Yeranos of the Gegharkunik Province, which is part of Armenia. He served in the Armenian Armed Forces as a conscript from 2009 to 2011. Kyaramyan, who graduated from the law faculty of Yerevan State University in 2013, participated in prosecutorial courses at the Justice Academy of Armenia in 2015, and in 2016, he completed a master's degree in law at Yerevan State University.

Career 
Kyaramyan had served in the Armenian policing services from 2013, and from 2014, as an investigator in the Armenian Investigative Committee, which he then served as the deputy head of. From 2016 to 2018, he worked as a prosecutor in the Shirak Province, and then in the capital Yerevan.

From June 2018, he held senior positions in various government agencies. In May 2020, he was appointed the deputy director of the Armenian National Security Service (NSS), and on 8 June 2020, he was promoted to the director of the Armenian NSS.  Kyaramyan was dismissed from this post on 8 October 2020, during the 2020 Nagorno-Karabakh War. He had reportedly been appointed the commander of the Armenian forces in Shusha, during the three-day long battle over the city, despite having no military experience. Then, on 6 November, he left Shusha, stating that his duties in the region were completely fulfilled. On 24 December 2020, he was appointed deputy chairman of the Armenian Investigative Committee.

Personal life 
Kyaramyan is married and has 2 children.

References 

1991 births
Living people
People from Gegharkunik Province
Yerevan State University alumni
Armenian jurists
21st-century Armenian politicians
Armenian military personnel of the 2020 Nagorno-Karabakh war